Ian Alfred Borchard (born 5 August 1957) is a former Australian rules footballer who played with  in the Victorian Football League (VFL) during the 1970s. He also played for West Adelaide in the South Australian National Football League (SANFL).

Playing career

VFL
Borchard, originally from Swan Hill in Victoria, spent three seasons at Richmond. In the last of those years, 1978, Borchard was cleared to play for South Fremantle in the Western Australian Football League (WAFL) midway through the season, but only lasted one week before he returned to Richmond on 29 June.

SANFL
He joined West Adelaide in 1979 and the following season won the first of his two Best & Fairest awards, the other coming in 1982. In 1981, Wests coach Neil Kerley appointed Borchard as captain West Adelaide, with the highlight being the 1983 premiership where he won the Jack Oatey Medal as the player of the match in the Grand Final win over Sturt at Football Park in front of 47,129 fans. Borchard remained captain of The Bloods until the end of the 1985 season when they finished in third place, beaten in the Preliminary final by North Adelaide.

After the premiership win in 1983, Borchard began to be plagued by injury, only playing in 14 games in 1984, 17 in 1985 when West reached the preliminary final. In 1986, Bloods coach John Cahill replaced Borchard as club captain with Mark Mickan, with injury restricting him to just 3 games for the year. Following the 1986 season, Borchard retired from league football.

Coaching
In late 2000 Ian Borchard was appointed coach of West Adelaide. He coached the Bloods to fifth place and the SANFL finals in both 2001 and 2002. After laying the groundwork for a good side, Borchard was replaced as coach of West Adelaide from the 2003 season by former Adelaide Crows and West Adelaide player Shaun Rehn, who in his first season coached the Bloods to their first SANFL Grand Final appearance since 1991.

References

External links

Holmesby, Russell and Main, Jim (2007). The Encyclopedia of AFL Footballers. 7th ed. Melbourne: Bas Publishing.

1957 births
Living people
Australian rules footballers from Victoria (Australia)
Richmond Football Club players
West Adelaide Football Club players
South Fremantle Football Club players
West Adelaide Football Club coaches
People from Swan Hill